Mad (stylized as MAD) is an American animated sketch comedy television series produced by Warner Bros. Animation. The series was based on Mad magazine, where each episode is a collection of short animated parodies of television shows, films, video games, celebrities, and other media, using various types of animation (CGI, claymation, stop-motion, photoshopped imagery, etc.) instead of the usual animation style that Warner Bros. Animation is known for. The series premiered on the evening of September 6, 2010 on Cartoon Network at 8:30 P.M. right after the series premiere of Regular Show. The series ended its three-year run on December 2, 2013.

Series developer Kevin Shinick worked as a writer, producer, and voice actor on Adult Swim's Robot Chicken, and many people cite Mad as a "kid-friendly version of Robot Chicken".

Recurring sketches
The series has some recurring sketches:

 A Mad Look Inside – A short piece in which viewers see a magical world inside a celebrity. This only played during Season 1.
 Alfred E. Neuman for President – During the Election of 2012, there were campaigns for Alfred E. Neuman's presidential election.
 Ask the Celebrity – Where various celebrities respond with absurd answers to questions in letters from fans. For example, when Miley Cyrus was asked to tell what she did to put on a good concert performance, she stated that she would rub cats on herself and walk on wool carpeting.
 Bad Idea # – This presents a scenario from the long list of possible bad ideas.
 Celebrities Without Their Make-Up – The segment shows what real and fictional celebrities would look like without their make-up. For example: Zach Galifianakis is Benson from Regular Show without his make-up, Russell Brand is a wooden nutcracker without his make-up, Robert Pattinson is Alfred E. Neuman without his make-up, Iron Man is C-3PO without his make-up, and SpongeBob SquarePants is a fruitcake without his make-up.
 Commercials – There are some commercials for fictional items and programs on every episode.
 Dear Reaper - The Grim Reaper reads and replies to letters from children regarding their deaths.
 Don Martin – Adaptations to comics strips by longtime Mad cartoonist Don Martin.
 Drawn-Out Dramas – After one of the primary sketches of the episode concludes, the Mad "wallpaper" will appear and "rip open" to reveal a Sergio Aragones-style sketch in front of a colored background, often using a version of Alfred E. Neuman in some capacity.
 Gross and Beyond Gross – Showcases the differences between "gross" and "beyond gross".
 MAD News – A newsman delivers recent news. This sketch originally began appearing randomly in the middle of an episode—usually interrupting another sketch. Starting with episode 9, the sketch served as a cold opening for every episode. With Season 3 and the introduction of the MADvent Calendar, it returned to being featured as an interruption.
 MADitorial – An editorial segment starting with episode 5 of Season 4. The sketch is animated by Jorge R. Gutierrez.
 MADucation 101... – Lessons in any subject.
 MADvent Calendar – A series of funny and ridiculous pop culture events that happened recently. Starting with Season 3, the sketch serves as the new cold opening for every episode.
 Mike Wartella – Animations by cartoonist M. Wartella.
 Rejected – A segment revealing rejected ideas within various pop culture properties like Rejected Transformers, Rejected Superheroes, Rejected Audition Tapes, Rejected Pokémon, Rejected Toy Story 3 Characters, Rejected Smurfs, and more.
 Security Cam – A presentation of surveillance footage of things that happens at public places during nightly closing hours. Each video features seemingly supernatural occurrences with the implicit suggestion that such things would never happen during the day.
 Snappy Answers to Stupid Questions – An adaptation of Al Jaffee's reoccurring magazine feature, it features a person who asks a question regarding something that was obviously presented, resulting in the person or people whom were so queried to give a sarcastic response that suggests otherwise.
 Spy vs. Spy – An adaptation of the long-running comic series Spy vs. Spy.
 Super-villains for Your... – A parody of the PSA segments from the Super Friends. Here various super-villains from the Legion of Doom present themselves as moral guidance to some child or children. However, being villains, they always manage to swindle, double cross, or betray the children resulting in them dying at the villain's hand or suffering some unforeseen related event.
 This Day in History – A look at an achievement on the day of the initial broadcast. Most cases it will involve a lesser known person of historical significance doing or coming up with something in the shadow of another well-known historical figure.
 What's Wrong with this Picture? – A game inviting the viewer to recognize something which is incorrect or out–of–place within the picture shown on the screen, but then reveals the correct or least likely things shown to be the expected answer.
 Where's Lady Gaga – A Where's Waldo type sketch featuring pop superstar Lady Gaga who is hiding at a small-time public function. The viewer is asked to try to find her only to see at the end that she is always cleverly disguised as a prop to blend in perfectly with her surroundings.

Episodes

Voice cast

Principal cast
 Kevin Shinick
 Hugh Davidson
 Mikey Day
 Larry Dorf
 Rachel Ramras
 Gary Anthony Williams

Guest/other voices

 Jason Antoon
 Eric Artell
 Diedrich Bader
 James Barbour
 Josh Beren
 Gregg Berger
 Jeff Bergman
 Gregg Bissonette
 Steven Blum
 Rachel Butera
 Jen Cohn
 Chris Cox
 Daniel Cummings
 Brian T. Delaney
 Grey DeLisle
 Barry Dennen
 John DiMaggio
 Ben Diskin
 Chris Edgerly
 Eden Espinosa
 Keith Ferguson
 Quinton Flynn
 Will Friedle
 Tamara Garfield
 Ralph Garman
 Mark-Paul Gosselaar
 Gilbert Gottfried
 Clare Grant
 Seth Green
 Nikki Griffin
 Melinda Hamilton
 Anthony Hansen
 Whit Hertford
 Aldis Hodge
 Richard Steven Horvitz
 Tom Kane
 Tom Kenny
 Seana Kofoed
 Stan Lee
 Matthew Lillard
 Beth Littleford
 Eric Lopez
 Biz Markie
 Deborah Marlowe
 Jason Marsden
 Julia McIlvaine
 Jim Meskimen
 Breckin Meyer
 Piotr Michael
 Dan Milano
 Shirley Mitchell
 Jason Nash
 Julie Nathanson
 Nolan North
 Jason Palmer
 Nicole Parker
 Rob Paulsen
 Christopher "Kid" Reid
 Corinne Reilly
 Peter Renaday
 Kevin Michael Richardson
 Joey Richter
 Elizabeth Rodriguez
 Rico Rodriguez
 Salli Saffioti
 Meredith Salenger
 Ben Schwartz
 Michael Sinterniklaas
 Dana Snyder
 Kath Soucie
 Stephen Stanton
 Brody Stevens
 Tara Strong
 James Patrick Stuart
 Cree Summer
 Catherine Taber
 Fred Tatasciore
 Kirk Thornton
 Ho-Kwan Tse
 Christine Tucci
 Alanna Ubach
 Andrew W.K.
 Windy Wagner
 Audrey Wasilewski
 Michaela Watkins
 Frank Welker
 Scott Whyte
 Billy Dee Williams
 Debra Wilson
 Thomas F. Wilson
 Henry Winkler
 Adam Wylie
 "Weird Al" Yankovic
 Victor Yerrid
 Keone Young

Awards and nominations

2012 Emmy Awards
Outstanding Short Format Animated Program for "Kitchen Nightmares Before Christmas / How I Met Your Mummy" (Nominated)

2012 PAAFTJ Television Awards
Best Animated Series (Nominated)

Home media
The DVD Mad – Season 1, Part 1 was released on September 20, 2011, with a matted 1.33:1 picture and an English stereo track. The extras on the DVD are trailers for Young Justice, the 2011 ThunderCats, and The Looney Tunes Show. The rest of the first season was released on January 17, 2012.

All four seasons of the series are available on the online streaming service Amazon Prime.

See also
Popzilla

References

External links

 

Mad (magazine)
2010 American television series debuts
2013 American television series endings
2010s American animated television series
2010s American anthology television series
2010s American satirical television series
2010s American sketch comedy television series
2010s American surreal comedy television series
2010s American variety television series
American children's animated anthology television series
American children's animated comedy television series
American computer-animated television series
American flash animated television series
American stop-motion animated television series
American television series with live action and animation
American television shows featuring puppetry
Animated television shows based on DC Comics
Cartoon Network original programming
Children's sketch comedy
Sketch comedy
Crossover animated television series
English-language television shows
Television shows based on magazines
Television series by Warner Bros. Animation
Television series created by Kevin Shinick